The Dean of Gibraltar is the head (primus inter pares – first among equals) and chair of the chapter of canons, the ruling body of the Cathedral of the Holy Trinity, Gibraltar. The cathedral is the mother church of the Diocese in Europe and the seat of the Bishop in Europe (though the bishop is now based in Brussels). The current (2020) Dean is Ian Tarrant.

List of deans

1905–1912 Decimus Govett
1913–1920 William Hayter
1921–1927 James Cropper
1928–1933 Geoffrey Warde
1933–1941 Walter Knight-Adkin
1941–1943 James Johnston (Acting)
1943–1945 William Ashley-Brown
1945–1950 Stephen Nason
1950–1960 Henry Lloyd
1960–1968 Godfrey Worsley
1968–1973 Ken Giggall
1973–1978 Ambrose Weekes
1978–1983 Robert Pope
1983–1985 John Rowlands
1986–1988 Anthony Nind
1989–1997 Brian Horlock
1997–2000 Gordon Reid
2000–2003 Kenneth Robinson
2003–2008 Alan Woods
2008November 2017 John Paddock
2017–2020: Robin Gill (acting dean)
13 October 2020present: Ian Tarrant (2 April installation postponed; licensed as "Bishop's Commissary in Gibraltar" ad interim)

References

Deans of Gibraltar
Deans of Gibraltar
 
Deans of Gibraltar